Nawab Zulfiqar Ali Magsi, (born 14 February 1954 in Jhal Magsi, Balochistan, Dominion of Pakistan) was the 20th Governor of Balochistan Province since 28 February 2008 to 9 June 2013 as well as the chief executive of Balochistan since 14 January 2013. He is the Nawab and Tumandar of the Magsi Tribe, a former Governor and a former Chief Executive of Balochistan, a senior politician and the former Chief Minister of Balochistan province in the Benazir Bhutto government of 1993–1996. Nawab was appointed as the Chief Executive of Balochistan on 13 January 2013 after the sacking of Aslam Raisani's unpopular government and imposition of Governor's Rule. It was the main after effect of the January 2013 Pakistan bombings. Nawab Magsi did his schooling from Aitchison College, Lahore. He first came to politics in 1977, when he won as an independent candidate seat from his native constituency in the provincial assembly. However, his family was involved in Balochistan politics before Pakistani independence. He served in many provincial ministries and also worked in the Home Ministry in the 1990s. In 1993, his coalition won majority of seats and he became Chief Minister of Balochistan.

In the February 2008 elections, he again stood as an independent candidate from his native PB-32 Jhal Magsi constituency and won without any opposition. On 27 February 2008, the caretaker Chief Minister Sardar Mohammad Saleh Bhootani announced officially that Nawab Magsi would be the next Governor of Balochistan province. On 28 February 2008 Nawab Magsi took oath in the Governor House at Quetta. In the ceremony, he promised to resolve the ongoing military operation in Balochistan, missing political workers and bring peace in province. On Wednesday, 19 March 2008, Nawab Magsi asked Balochistan Government issue an outstanding bill against federal government and the Sindh Government of 128bn rupees.

Political career

Nawab Magsi started his political career in 1977 when he participated in general elections as independent candidate and elected as Member Provincial Assembly. He also took part in the non-party elections of 1985 and returned successful as a Member, Provincial Assembly of Balochistan (MPA). He was re-elected as MPA in 1988 and again in 1990. He remained Provincial Minister Education and Planning and Development in 1988 while he served as Provincial Minister in Balochistan in 1990. He was twice elected as Chief Minister of Balochistan and remained in office from 30 May 1993 to 19 July 1993 and from 20 October 1993 to 10 November 1996 respectively. 

In the general elections of 1997 he returned successful as MPA for the sixth time. He did not participate in 2002 elections. In the recent elections in 2008, he participated as independent candidate of Provincial Assembly and won his traditional seat. He was appointed by the President of Islamic Republic of Pakistan, as Governor of Balochistan on 28 February 2008 and on the same day, he took oath of his office. He resigned as Governor of Balochistan after prime minister-in-waiting Nawaz Sharif announced to bring the next governor from Mehmood Khan Achakzai's Pakhtunkhwa Milli Awami Party (PkMAP) which was accepted by the President on 9 June 2013.

See also
 Yousaf Aziz Magsi
 Jam Nizamuddin II
 Shama Parveen Magsi
 Magsi

References

External links
 Profile of New Governor of Balochistan - Archived

1954 births
Tumandars
Nawabs of Balochistan, Pakistan
People from Jhal Magsi District
Aitchison College alumni
University of the Punjab alumni
Pakistani hunters
Governors of Balochistan, Pakistan
Chief Ministers of Balochistan, Pakistan
Baloch people
Living people
Forman Christian College alumni
Balochistan MPAs 1993–1996
Zulfiqar Ali Khan